"Taller, Stronger, Better" is a song written by Guy Sebastian, Gary Pinto and Phil Turcio and was the first single off Sebastian third studio album, Closer to the Sun. He performed the song in the finale of It Takes Two and the Top 24 show of Australian Idol before the single was released. The single debuted at number three in the ARIA Charts, and remained in the top ten for six weeks and gained gold accreditation.

Track listing

Charts

Certifications

References

2006 singles
Guy Sebastian songs
Songs written by Guy Sebastian
Pop ballads
2006 songs
Sony BMG singles
Songs written by Gary Pinto